Ionuț Ursu (born 21 March 1989) is a Romanian footballer who plays as a centre back.

Club career
He made his debut on the professional league level in the Liga I for Botoșani on 21 July 2013 as a starter in a game against CFR Cluj.

Honours

FCM Bacău
Liga III: 2010–11

FC Botoșani
Liga II: 2012–13

References

External links
Profile  on Liga1.ro
 Farul Constanta l-a transferat si pe Ionut Ursu
 Official FC Botoșani profile

Living people
1989 births
Romanian footballers
Association football defenders
Liga I players
Liga II players
FCM Bacău players
FCM Dunărea Galați players
AFC Săgeata Năvodari players
FC Botoșani players
Sepsi OSK Sfântu Gheorghe players
FC Universitatea Cluj players
FCV Farul Constanța players
FC Unirea Constanța players
CSM Ceahlăul Piatra Neamț players
Sportspeople from Bacău